The Vilna Ghetto was a World War II Jewish ghetto established and operated by Nazi Germany in the city of Vilnius in the modern country of Lithuania, at the time part of the Nazi-administered Reichskommissariat Ostland.

During the approximately two years of its existence starvation, disease, street executions, maltreatment, and deportations to concentration and extermination camps reduced the ghetto's population from an estimated 40,000 to zero.

Only several hundred people managed to survive, mostly by hiding in the forests surrounding the city, joining Soviet partisans, or sheltering with sympathetic locals.

Background 
Before the German-Soviet invasion of Poland in September 1939, Wilno (Vilna in Yiddish) was the capital of the Wilno Voivodship in the Second Polish Republic. The predominant languages of the city were Polish and to a lesser extent, Yiddish. The Lithuanian-speaking population at the time was a small minority, at about 6% of the city's population according to contemporary Lithuanian sources. By 1931, the city had 195,000 inhabitants, making it the fifth largest city in Poland with varied industries and new factories, as well as a well respected university.

Wilno was a predominantly Polish and Jewish city since the Polish-Lithuanian borders were delineated in 1922 by the League of Nations in the aftermath of Żeligowski's Mutiny. After the Soviet invasion of Poland in September 1939, Joseph Stalin transferred Wilno to Lithuania in October, according to the Soviet–Lithuanian Mutual Assistance Treaty. Some two years later, on 26 June 1941, the German Army entered Vilna, followed by the Einsatzkommando death squad Einsatzgruppe B. Local Lithuanian leaders advocated ethnic cleansing of Jews and Poles. Throughout the summer, German troops and their Lithuanian collaborators killed more than 21,000 Jews living in Vilnius, in a mass extermination program.

The Jewish population of Vilnius on the eve of the Holocaust was at least 60,000, some estimates say 80,000, including refugees from German-occupied Poland to the west, minus a small number who managed to flee onward to the Soviet Union. The kidnapping and mass murder of Jews in the city commenced before the ghetto was set up by the advancing German forces, resulting in an execution of approximately 21,000 victims prior to 6 September 1941. The Lithuanian kidnappers were known in Yiddish as hapunes, meaning grabbers or snatchers.

1941: Establishment of the ghetto

In order to pacify the predominantly poorer Jewish quarter in the Vilnius Old Town and force the rest of the more affluent Jewish residents into the new German-envisioned ghetto, the Nazis staged – as a pretext – the Great Provocation incident on 31 August 1941, led by SS Einsatzkommando 9 Oberscharführer Horst Schweinberger under orders from Gebietskommissar of the Vilnius municipality Hans Christian Hingst and Franz Murer, Hingst's deputy for Jewish affairs under "provisional directives" of Reichskommissar Hinrich Lohse.

Murer, Hingst, and Vilnius mayor Karolis Dabulevičius selected the site for the future ghetto and staged a distant sniping at German soldiers in front of a cinema, from a window on the corner of Stiklių (Glezer, meaning Szklana in Polish) and Didžioji (Wielka, Great Street in Polish, hence the name for the event) streets, by two Lithuanians in civilian clothes who had broken into an apartment belonging to Jews. The Lithuanians fled the apartment, then returned with awaiting German soldiers, captured two Jews, accused them of firing on the German soldiers, beat them and then shot them on the spot. Stiklių and Mėsinių (Jatkowa) streets were ransacked by the local militia, and Jews were beaten up.
At night, in "retaliation", all Jews were driven out of the neighborhood the Nazis had selected as the future ghetto territory, street by street, and the next day the women and children on remaining streets were seized while the men were at work. Men at workplaces were also seized. Jews were taken to Lukiškės Prison, then to Paneriai, also known as Ponary (or Ponar), where they were murdered between 1 September and 3 September. 5,000 to 10,000 people were murdered, including ten members of the Judenrat. The objective was to clear an area for the establishment of a ghetto to imprison all the Jews of Vilnius and its suburbs.

The area designated for the ghetto was the old Jewish quarter in the center of the city. While Vilna never had a ghetto per se except for some very limited restrictions on the movement and settlement of Jews during the Middle Ages, the area chosen by the Nazis for their ghetto was predominantly and historically inhabited by Jews. The Nazis split the area into two Jewish quarters (Large Ghetto and Small Ghetto), with a non-ghetto corridor running down Deutschegasse (Niemiecka or Vokiečių) Street.

On 6–7 September 1941, the Nazis herded the remaining 20,000 Jews into the two ghettos by evicting them from their homes, during which 3,700 were killed. Converts, "half-Jews" and spouses of Jews were also forced into the ghetto. The move to the ghetto was extremely hurried and difficult, and Jews were not allowed to use transportation, being able to take only what they were physically able to carry.

The first Aktion was called the Gelb Schein (yellow pass) Aktion as the Germans delivered 3,000 passes to workers and their families and let 12,000 people on the ghetto. Between 25 and 27 October 1941, 3,781 people who did not have this pass were killed in Ponary.

The two-ghetto arrangement made it easier for the Nazis to control what the victims knew of their fate beforehand, facilitating the Nazis' goal of total extermination. A two-ghetto model was also used in Warsaw. Like the other Jewish ghettos Nazi Germany set up during World War II, the Vilnius Ghetto was created both to dehumanise the people and to exploit its inmates as slave labor. Conditions were intended to be extremely poor and crowded, subjecting inhabitants to unsanitary conditions, disease and daily death.

1942: Quiet period

Health care
Jewish Vilna was known for its distinguished medical tradition, which inmates of the ghetto managed to maintain to some degree during the Holocaust. As with most ghettos established by the Germans, a sign was put right outside in front stating: "Achtung! Seuchengefahr" ("Attention! Danger of Infection"). Mortality rates did, indeed, increase in the Vilna Ghetto as compared with before the war. However, due largely to the efforts of the ghetto's Health Department, the Vilna Ghetto had no major epidemics despite malnourishment, cold, and overcrowding. According to Dr. Lazar Epstein, head of Sanitary-Epidemiological Section of the ghetto's Health Department, the inmates of the ghetto, left to their own devices, could have lived a very long time, certainly to the end of the war, despite the numerous privations.

Cultural life 
The Vilna Ghetto was called "Yerushalayim of the Ghettos" because it was known for its intellectual and cultural spirit. Before the war, Vilnius had been known as "Yerushalayim d'Lita" (Yiddish: Jerusalem of Lithuania) for the same reason. The center of cultural life in the ghetto was the Mefitze Haskole Library, which was called the "House of Culture". It contained a library of 45,000 volumes, reading hall, archive, statistical bureau, room for scientific work, museum, book kiosk, post office, and sports ground. Groups, such as the Literary and Artistic Union and the Brit Ivrit Union, organized events commemorating Yiddish and Hebrew authors and put on plays in these languages. The popular Yiddish magazine Folksgezunt was continued in the ghetto and its essays were presented in public lectures. Yitskhok Rudashevski (1927–1943), a young teen who wrote a diary of his life in the ghetto during 1941 to 1943, mentions a number of these events and his participation in them. He was murdered in the liquidation of 1943, probably at Paneriai. His diary was discovered in 1944 by his cousin.

The Vilna Ghetto was well known for its theatrical productions during World War II. Jacob Gens, the head of Jewish police and the ruler of the Vilna Ghetto, was given the responsibility for the starting of this theatre. Performances included poetry readings by Jewish authors, dramatizations of short stories, and new work by the young people of the ghetto.

The Ghetto Theatre was a great source of revenue and had a calming effect on the public. A total of 111 performances had been given by January 10, 1943, with a total of 34,804 tickets sold. The theatre was renovated to accommodate a larger audience and be better-looking to public eye. The theatre permitted the inhabitants to display their power through plays and songs; for instance, one of the songs that was sung was called "Endurance".

The last theatrical production, Der Mabl (The Flood), was produced by the Swedish dramatist Henning Berger and opened in the summer of 1943, in the last week of the ghetto's existence. The play, set in an American saloon during a flood, featured a group of people who banded together during a time of danger and need.

Resistance 

The Fareynikte Partizaner Organizatsye (FPO), or United Partisan Organization, was formed on 21 January 1942 in the ghetto. It took for its motto "We will not go like sheep to the slaughter," proposed by Abba Kovner. This was one of the first resistance organizations established in a Nazi ghetto. Unlike in other ghettos, the resistance movement in the Vilna Ghetto was not run by ghetto officials. Jacob Gens, appointed head of the ghetto by the Nazis but originally chief of police, ostensibly cooperated with German officials in stopping armed struggle. The FPO represented the full spectrum of political persuasions and parties in Jewish life. It was led by Yitzhak Wittenberg, Josef Glazman, and Kovner. The purposes of the FPO were to establish a means for the self-defence of the ghetto population, to sabotage German industrial and military activities, and to support the broader struggle of partisans and Red Army operatives against German forces. Poet Hirsh Glick, a ghetto inmate who later died after being deported to Estonia, penned the words for what became the famous Partisan Hymn, Zog nit keyn mol.

In early 1943, the Germans caught a member of the Communist underground, who, under torture, revealed some contacts; the Judenrat, in response to German threats, tried to turn Wittenberg, head of the FPO, over to the Gestapo. The Fareynikte Partizaner Organizatsye organized an uprising and was able to rescue him after he was seized in the apartment of Jacob Gens in a fight with Jewish ghetto police. Gens brought in heavies, the leaders of the work brigades, and effectively turned the majority of the population against the resistance members, claiming they were provoking the Germans and asking rhetorically whether it was worth sacrificing tens of thousands for the sake of one man. Ghetto prisoners assembled and demanded the FPO give Wittenberg up. Ultimately, Wittenberg himself made the decision to submit to Nazi demands. He was taken to Gestapo headquarters in Vilnius and was reportedly found dead in his cell the next morning. Most people believed he had committed suicide. The rumour was that Gens had slipped him a cyanide pill in their final meeting.

The FPO was demoralized by this chain of events and began to pursue a policy of sending young people out to the forest to join other Jewish partisans. This was controversial as well because the Germans applied a policy of 'collective responsibility' under which all family members of anyone who had joined the partisans were executed. In the Vilna Ghetto, a 'family' often included a non-relation who registered as a member of the family in order to receive housing and a pitiful food ration.

When the Germans came to liquidate the ghetto in September 1943, members of the FPO went on alert. Gens took control of the liquidation in order to keep the Nazi forces out of the ghetto and away from a partisan ambush, but helped fill the quota of Jews with those who could fight but were not necessarily part of the resistance. The FPO fled to the forest and fought with the partisans.

1943: Liquidation
From the establishment of the ghetto until January 1942, task groups of German and Lithuanian Einsatzgruppen regularly carried out the surprise operations called Aktionen, often on Jewish holidays. The ghetto residents were rounded up and deported, usually for subsequent executions. In the Aktion on Yom Kippur of 1 October 1941, the Germans ordered the Judenrat to lead the arrests leading to the death of 1,983 people; residents found by the Jewish police lacking work permits were arrested and transferred to German custody. The same month the Germans liquidated the Small Ghetto, where they had relocated 'unproductive' individuals (i.e., who were old, ill, or otherwise considered unfit for labour); most of the prisoners were taken to Ponary and shot. About 20,000 Jews, including 8,000 without papers, remained in the Large Ghetto. The period between January 1942 and March 1943 was known as the time of ghetto "stabilization"; the Aktionen ceased and some semblance of normal life resumed. The quiet period continued until 6 August, when the Germans commenced the deportation of 7,130 Jews to Estonia on the order of Heinrich Himmler; this was finished on 5 September. Following an order of Rudolf Neugebauer, the head of the Vilnius Gestapo, the ghetto was liquidated on 23–24 September 1943  under the command of Oberscharführer Bruno Kittel. The majority of the remaining residents were sent to the Vaivara concentration camp in Estonia, killed in the forest of Paneriai, or sent to the death camps in German-occupied Poland.

A small group of Jews remained in Vilna after the liquidation of the ghetto, primarily at the Kailis and HKP 562 forced labour camps. Inmates of HKP 562 repaired automobiles for the German Army; the camp was commanded by the Wehrmacht Major Karl Plagge who, with the cooperation of his officers and men, was able to shield the Jewish auto-workers from much of the abuse slave laborers were ordinarily subjected to. When the Red Army approached Vilna and the SS came to take over the camp, Plagge gave his workers a covert warning; some workers escaped, others hid in hiding places they had prepared with Plagge's knowledge, from which they subsequently escaped. Two-hundred and fifty Jews at HKP 562 survived the war. They represent the single largest group of Jewish survivors of the Holocaust in Vilnius.

Post-war 
Among all the European Jewish communities during WWII, the Lithuanian one was the most affected by the Holocaust. Rising to 265,000 individuals in June 1941, it was decimated and lost 254,000, or 95%, of its members during the Nazi occupation of Lithuania. The Green House Museum, a branch of the Vilna Gaon Jewish State Museum, reminds visitors of massive collaboration, presenting documents and testimonials. Rachel Kostanian was awarded the Order of Merits  from Germany for this achievement in 2021.

Joshua Sobol's 1984 play Ghetto recounts the last days of the Vilna Ghetto theatre company.

In 2021 a virtual 360-degree tour about the former Vilnius Ghetto was created to present arts, education and creative endeavours within the ghetto in horrifying circumstances.

People of the Vilna Ghetto 
 
 Samuel Bak (1933-), artist who lived in the ghetto as a child
 Jacob Gens (1903–1943), head of police of the ghetto
 Josef Glazman (1913–1943), ghetto resistance fighter
 Hirsh Glick (1922–1944), ghetto resistance fighter
 Bruno Kittel (1922–?), SS-Oberscharführer, brought in to liquidate the ghetto after Murer
 Abba Kovner (1918–1987), ghetto resistance fighter
 Herman Kruk (1897–1944), librarian, and a diarist of the ghetto
 Ljuba Lewicka (1909–1943), singer 
 Franz Murer (1912–1994), SS-Oberscharführer, the 'Butcher of Vilnius'
 Rudolf Neugebauer (1912–1944), SS-Hauptsturmführer
 Adrian von Renteln (1897–?), Generalkommissar of Lithuania, involved in the liquidation of the ghetto
 Yitskhok Rudashevski (1927–1943), writer of a diary in the ghetto
 Abraham Sutzkever (1913–2010), poet, book smuggler, ghetto resistance fighter
 Martin Weiss (1903–1984), SS-Hauptscharführer
 Yitzhak Wittenberg (1907–1943), ghetto resistance fighter

See also 
 History of the Jews in Lithuania
 Jewish response to The Forty Days of Musa Dagh
 Karl Plagge (1897–1957), Major, in charge of HKP 562 forced labor camp
 List of Jewish ghettos in German-occupied Poland

Notes

References

Bibliography
Arad, Yitzhak. Ghetto in Flames. (Jerusalem: Ahva Cooperative Printing Press, 1980).
Balberyszski, Mendel "Stronger Than Iron": The Destruction of Vilna Jewry 1941-1945-An Eyewitness Account. (Jerusalem: Gefen Publishing House, 2010).+
Feierstein, Daniel. "The Jewish Resistance Movements in the Ghettos of Eastern Europe." In: Life in the Ghettos During the Holocaust. Ed. Eric J. Sterling. (Syracuse: Syracuse University Press, 2005).
Kostanian-Danzig, Rachel. Spiritual Resistance in the Vilna Ghetto. (Vilnius: The Vilna Gaon Jewish State Museum, 2002).
Kruk, Herman. The Last Days of the Jerusalem of Lithuania: Chronicles from the Vilna Ghetto and the Camps, 1939-1944. (New Haven: Yale University Press, 2002).
Rudashevski, Yitskhok (1927–1943). Diary of the Vilna Ghetto, June 1941-April 1943. (Israel: Ghetto Fighters' House, 1973).
Shneidman, N.N. Jerusalem of Lithuania: The Rise and Fall of Jewish Vilnius, A Personal Perspective. (Okaville, ON: Mosaic Press, 1998).

External links 
 The Jerusalem of Lithuania: The Story of the Jewish Community of Vilna an online exhibition by Yad Vashem
 Gens in response to resistance
 Gens in response to the concert
 partisans on their program
 Chronicles of the Vilnius Ghetto
 About the Holocaust
 Jewish Partisan Group Near Vilnius
 Kurzbiographien
 Partisans in Vilnius
 Rozka Korczak & Abba Kovner with members of the United Partisan Organization (FPO)
 Vilnius Partisans
 Testimony of Grzegorz Jaszuński concerning life in the Wilno Ghetto in "Chronicles of Terror" testimony database (Polish and English)
 
 Article regarding the Piramont Jewish Cemetery in Vilnius The Times of Israel 16 August 2021

 
History of Vilnius
Jewish ghettos in Nazi-occupied Lithuania
Jewish Lithuanian history
Ghettos in Nazi-occupied Europe
1942 in Lithuania
The Holocaust